Jonas Augusto Bouvie (born October 5, 1986) was a Brazilian football player.

References
 J. League (#34)

External links
 
 

1986 births
Living people
Brazilian footballers
Brazilian expatriate footballers
Brazilian expatriate sportspeople in Japan
Brazilian expatriate sportspeople in South Korea
Brazilian expatriate sportspeople in China
Sociedade Esportiva e Recreativa Caxias do Sul players
Londrina Esporte Clube players
Cerezo Osaka players
Suwon FC players
Meizhou Hakka F.C. players
J1 League players
K League 2 players
K League 1 players
China League One players
Expatriate footballers in Japan
Expatriate footballers in South Korea
Expatriate footballers in China
Association football forwards